Ayo Oke is the former director general of Nigeria's National Intelligence Agency (NIA), appointed by then president Goodluck Jonathan on 7 November 2013.

Early life
Ayo Oke was born in Oyo state.

Career
Oke was previously the Director (Regions) at the headquarters of the NIA, and before that Nigeria's ambassador to the Commonwealth Secretariat in London. He succeeded Ezekiel Olaniyi Oladeji as director general of Nigeria's National Intelligence Agency in November 2013.

Suspension and dismissal
In April 2017, Oke was suspended by president Muhammadu Buhari after anti-corruption officers from the Economic and Financial Crimes Commission found more than US$43 million (£34m) in an apartment at Osborne Towers, Ikoyi, Lagos.
On 30 October, Oke was finally dismissed by the Nigerian President, Muhammadu Buhari after consideration of the report of the investigative committee headed by the Vice President.

References

Living people
Nigerian diplomats
Nigerian security personnel
Corruption in Nigeria
People from Oyo State
Nigerian spies
Year of birth missing (living people)